"Gimme the Love" is a song by English singer-songwriter Jake Bugg and is the second track on his third album On My One. The song was released as a double A-side single with "On My One" on April 22, 2016.

In popular culture
In 2017 the song was featured in Codemasters game, Dirt 4.

Track listings

References

2016 songs
Songs written by Jake Bugg
Jake Bugg songs
Mercury Records singles
2016 singles